Mission Inn Resort & Club, originally called "Floridian Country Club" until 1964, is a public golf resort in Howey-in-the-Hills, Florida. It consists of two 18-hole courses: El Campeón (The Champion), built in 1917, and Las Colinas (The Hills), built in 1992.

References

Golf clubs and courses in Florida